A spill of the leadership of the Liberal Party of Australia took place on 9 May 1989, following internal maneuverings by supporters of John Howard's long-time rival, Andrew Peacock. The spill was won by Andrew Peacock over John Howard by 44 votes to 27.

Background
During 1988 Liberal Party President John Elliott was the subject of much leadership speculation which undermined John Howard's leadership. This ended after the seat which Elliott sought, Higgins didn't become available. In February, Elliott said confidentially to former leader and current Deputy leader Andrew Peacock, that he would support him in a leadership challenge against Howard.

In Late 1988 John Howard promoted his policy of One Australia which called for an end to Multiculturalism and called for the rate of Asian immigration to Australia to be reduced. There were widespread objections to the policy from within the Liberal Party, including from Victorian Premier Jeff Kennett, New South Wales Premier Nick Greiner, former Prime Minister Malcolm Fraser, and former immigration ministers Ian Macphee and Michael MacKellar. Some political commentators later postulated that the dissent within the Liberal Party over immigration policy weakened Howard's leadership position, contributing to him being overthrown as Liberal Party leader by Andrew Peacock.

A group of Peacock supporters, nicknamed "The Cardinals" worked behind the scenes for most of year to get the numbers to replace Howard with Peacock. By the time that former shadow minister Ian Macphee lost his preselection, it was decided that the time was right to move against Howard. Firstly Senate leader Fred Chaney, Peacock's first choice as deputy, was persuaded to reluctantly switch his support, then, Peacock, Chaney, and Chaney's Senate deputy Austin Lewis, being other members of the leadership team, informed Howard that 40 members wanted the matter of leadership raised at the next party meeting.

Despite being a key architect in Peacock's comeback, Wilson Tuckey stood for the deputy's position against Peacock's choice of deputy, Senator Chaney, but was eliminated in the first ballot.

Candidates
 Andrew Peacock, incumbent Deputy Leader, Shadow Treasurer, Member for Kooyong
 John Howard, incumbent Leader, Member for Bennelong

Results

The following tables gives the ballot results:

Leadership ballot

Deputy leadership ballot

Aftermath
Fred Chaney succeeded Peacock as Deputy Leader. Declining Peacock's offer of Shadow Minister for Education, Howard went to the backbench and a new period of party disunity ensued which was highlighted by a Four Corners episode detailing the coup against Howard. In October Howard did accept an offer to return to the frontbench as Shadow Minister for Industry, Technology and Commerce.

This spill saw Peacock return to the leadership almost four years after his resignation in September 1985.
In the immediate aftermath of this spill the just deposed Howard was asked the chances of him making his own comeback to the leadership.

Howard expressed his doubts on his own comeback saying it would be  "like Lazarus with a triple bypass".

Howard did eventually return to the leadership in January 1995 and became Prime Minister when he led the Coalition to victory at the 1996 election.

References

Liberal Party of Australia leadership spills
Liberal Party of Australia leadership spill